Dongfang is one of the seven county-level cities of Hainan province, China. Although called a "city", Dongfang refers to a large land area in Hainan - an area which was once a county. Within this area is the main city, Dongfang City. It is located on the western coast of Hainan Island facing Vietnam across the Gulf of Tonkin, and in 2004 had a population of 435,000.

As all county-level units, Dongfang is administratively divided into township-level units (see the list). The main urban area of Dongfang (i.e., what used to be called "the county seat", when Dongfang was a county) is the town of Basuo.

The former county of Ganen (postal: Kumyan, Kanem or Kamyan) is now part of the city.

Geography and climate
Dongfang has a tropical wet and dry climate (Köppen Aw). Monsoonal influences are strong, and the two seasons are the wet season and the dry season (November to April), when very little rainfall occurs. January through March features the highest relative humidity levels of the year, while May through August is very sunny, consistently averaging above 60% of possible sunshine. With monthly percent possible sunshine ranging from 46% in February to 67% in May, the city receives 2,558 hours of sunshine annually, a level not seen in the southern half of China outside of Tibet. The average low temperature remains above  from June to August.

Administrative divisions
Dongfang administers eight towns and two townships:

Towns:
Basuo
Donghe
Datian
Gancheng
Banqiao
Sanjia
Sigeng
Xinlong

Townships:
Tian'an Township
Jiangbian Township

References

External links

Cities in Hainan
County-level divisions of Hainan